Woodrow Wilson Awards are given out in multiple countries each year by the Woodrow Wilson International Center for Scholars of the Smithsonian Institution to individuals in both the public sphere and business who have shown an outstanding commitment to President of the United States Woodrow Wilson's dream of integrating politics, scholarship, and policy for the common good.  Created in 1999 as a local Award for leadership in Washington, DC, the Awards were expanded in 2001 to recognize great leaders and thinkers throughout the world.  Funding from the Awards supports additional research, scholars, and programs in Washington and the home community of the recipients.

Woodrow Wilson Award for Public Service
The Woodrow Wilson Award for Public Service is given to individuals who have served with distinction in public life and have shown a special commitment to seeking out informed opinions and thoughtful views. Recipients of this award share Woodrow Wilson’s steadfast belief in public discourse, scholarship, and the extension of the benefits of knowledge in the United States and around the world. These leaders devote themselves to examining the historical background and long-term implications of important public policy issues while encouraging the free and open exchange of ideas that is the bedrock of our nation’s foundation.

Woodrow Wilson Award for Corporate Citizenship
The Woodrow Wilson Award for Corporate Citizenship is given to executives who demonstrate a commitment to the common good—beyond the bottom line. They are the people who demonstrate that private firms should be good citizens in their own neighborhoods, as well as in the world. The award is given to those who have done tremendous work in improving their local communities and the world at large.

Woodrow Wilson International Center for Scholars

About the Woodrow Wilson Center

The Wilson Center is the living memorial to President Woodrow Wilson, with headquarters in Washington, D.C. The Center was established as part of the Smithsonian in 1968 by an act of the United States Congress. It is a nonpartisan research institution that is committed to fostering research, study, and discussion of national and global affairs. The Center promotes collaboration among a full spectrum of individuals concerned with policy and scholarship in national and world affairs. The mission of the Center is to commemorate the ideals and concerns of President Wilson by providing a link between the world of ideas and the world of policy. Lee H. Hamilton is the president and director of the Wilson Center.

As Part of the Smithsonian Institution

The Woodrow Wilson Center is a research body kim belonging to the Smithsonian Institution. The Smithsonian Institution is an educational and research institute and associated museum complex, administered and funded by the government of the United States and by funds from its endowment, contributions, and profits from its shops and its magazine. Most of its facilities are located in Washington, D.C., but its 19 museums, zoo, mental hospitals and eight research centers include sites in New York City, Virginia, Panama, and elsewhere. It has over 142 million items in its collections. Other research institutions alongside the Woodrow Wilson Center are the Archives of American Art, Smithsonian Astrophysical Observatory and the associated Center for Astrophysics  Harvard & Smithsonian, Carrie Bow Marine Field Station, Center for Folklife and Cultural Heritage, Smithsonian Environmental Research Center, Center For Earth and Planetary Studies, Conservation and Research Center, Marine Station at Fort Pierce, Migratory Bird Center, Museum Conservation Institute, Smithsonian Tropical Research Institute, and Smithsonian Institution Libraries.

Woodrow Wilson Award Recipients
Awardees are chosen by the Wilson Center Board of Trustees in recognition of their work to benefit society. In line with President Wilson's vision, honorees participate in efforts to improve the global community through collaboration and open dialogue. They have made contributions to advance education, peace, health care, culture, legislation, sportsmanship, technology, scholastic research, and leadership.

Woodrow Wilson Awards have gone to a diverse set of professionals, including scientists, politicians, entertainers, diplomats, athletes, business executives, doctors and philanthropists. Among business executives, their industries include health care, hotels, restaurants and energy.

Public Service
The following individuals are among the recipients of the Woodrow Wilson Center award for Public Service:

Jacques Attali, economist, writer and humanitarian 
James A. Baker III, United States Secretary of State
Santiago Calatrava, architect
Elaine L. Chao, United States Secretary of Labor
Gustavo A. Cisneros
Hillary Clinton, First Lady of the United States, United States senator, United States Secretary of State
William Cohen, United States senator, United States Secretary of Defense
Dianne Feinstein, United States senator
Betty Ford, First Lady of the United States
Frank Gehry, architect
John Glenn, astronaut and United States senator
John Howard, Prime Minister of Australia
Stephen Harper, Prime Minister of Canada
A. P. J. Abdul Kalam, 11th President of India
Henry Kissinger, National Security Advisor and United States Secretary of State
Luiz Inácio Lula da Silva, President of Brazil
Preston Manning, Canadian politician
John McCain, United States senator
Daniel Patrick Moynihan, United States senator
Brian Mulroney, Prime Minister of Canada
Rick Perry, Governor of Texas
Janet Napolitano, Governor of Arizona and Secretary of Homeland Security
Wayne Newton, entertainer, activist
Queen Noor Al Hussein, Queen of Jordan
Dolly Parton, entertainer, philanthropist
David Petraeus, United States Army general
Colin Powell and Alma Powell, United States Army general and United States Secretary of State
Penny Pritzker, civil servant
Tom Ridge, member of the United States House of Representatives, Governor of Pennsylvania and Secretary of Homeland Security

Dilma Rousseff, President of Brazil
Ahn Sang-soo, former mayor of Incheon
Bud Selig, Commissioner of Baseball
Barbara Walters, journalist
Andrew Lloyd Webber, composer
Ronald Weiser, former Ambassador to Slovakia
Pete Wilson, United States senator, and Governor of California
Lee Kuan Yew, Prime Minister of Singapore

Corporate citizenship
The following individuals are recipients of the Woodrow Wilson Center award for Corporate Citizenship (incomplete list):

Miriam and Sheldon Adelson, Las Vegas Sands Corp.
Bernard Arnault, LVMH Moët Hennessy Louis Vuitton
Craig and Barbara Barrett, Intel
Jack O. Bovender, Jr., Hospital Corporation of America
Steve and Jean Case, AOL
Clarence P. Cazalot, Jr., Marathon Oil
Paul Desmarais, Power Corporation du Canada
Richard M. DeVos, Alticor
Laurence D. Fink, BlackRock
Charlie Fischer, Nexen
Drew J. Guff, Siguler Guff & Company
Niall W. A. FitzGerald, Thomson Reuters
Joseph B. Gildenhorn, The JBG Companies
Richard F. Haskayne, Canadian Wealth Management
Ray L. Hunt, Hunt Oil Company
Irwin M. Jacobs, QUALCOMM, Inc.
Jeffrey A. Joerres, Manpower Inc.
Robert Wood Johnson IV, New York Jets
Pete and Ada Lee Correll, Georgia Pacific
Frank Lowy AC, Westfield Group
Frederic and Marlene Malek, Thayer Capital
Andrew J. McKenna, McDonald's
Henry McKinnell, Pfizer Inc.
Peter Munk, Barrick Gold
Yong Nam, LG Electronics
Jack Nicklaus, Nicklaus Companies
David O'Reilly, Chevron Corporation
Peter G. Peterson, Blackstone Group
T. Boone Pickens, BP Capital Management
William H. Swanson, Raytheon
Shoichiro Toyoda, Toyota Motor Corporation
John H. Tyson, Tyson Foods
Leslie Wexner, Limited Brands, Inc.
Lorenzo Zambrano, Cemex
Viktor Vekselberg, Renova

Award presentations
Recipients are given the awards at ceremonial dinners in various cities and countries. At each dinner, the Woodrow Wilson Award for Public Service and the Woodrow Wilson Award for Corporate Citizenship are presented. In some places, the Wilson Center will host events where different scholars talk about local policy issues, before the award reception.

See also
Woodrow Wilson International Center for Scholars
Smithsonian Institution

References

External links

 Woodrow Wilson Awards
 Woodrow Wilson Center
 Smithsonian Institution

News Articles
 Andrew Lloyd Webber receives Prestigious Award$
 Vekselberg Wins American Award$ 
 Adelsons win prestigious award for philanthropy
 MLB Commissioner Selig awarded for lifetime work for others$
 Jack Nicklaus honored in Florida$
 Ambassador receives prestigious award from the Woodrow Wilson Center$
 Africans honored with Woodrow Wilson Awards$
 Peter Preuss and Irwin Jacobs get Wilson Awards in San Diego$
 O’Malley Receives Woodrow Wilson Award for Public Service$
 Nicklaus Honored by Woodrow Wilson International Center$
 John Howard receives America's Woodrow Wilson Award$
 Manuel, Ackerman honoured with prestigious US award $
 President Lula receives prestigious Woodrow Wilson Public Service Award$

Woodrow Wilson
Smithsonian Institution